Alfred Carroll (6 March 1920 – November 1994) was an English professional footballer who played as a centre half.

Career
Born in Bradford, Carroll played for US Metallic Packing and Bradford City. For Bradford City, he made 28 appearances in the Football League.

Sources

References

1920 births
1994 deaths
English footballers
Bradford City A.F.C. players
English Football League players
Association football defenders